Floyd E. Wedderburn (born May 5, 1976) is a former professional American football player who played guard for three seasons for the Seattle Seahawks.  Floyd attended Upper Darby High School, where he lettered in football, basketball, and track and field (shot put and discus). Floyd went on to play football for Joe Paterno at Penn State University.

References

1976 births
Living people
Sportspeople from Kingston, Jamaica
Jamaican players of American football
American football offensive guards
Penn State Nittany Lions football players
Seattle Seahawks players